Han Qiwei (2 November 1933 – 1 October 2019) was a Chinese hydraulic engineer and an academician of the Chinese Academy of Engineering.

Biography
Han was born in Songzi, Hubei, on 2 November 1933. In 1956 he graduated from today's Wuhan University. From 1962 to 1980 he worked at the River Research Laboratory, Changjiang Academy of Sciences. He worked at China Water Conservancy and Hydropower Research Institute since 1980. He was elected an academician of the Chinese Academy of Engineering (CAE) in 2001. He died of illness in Beijing, aged 86.

References

1933 births
2019 deaths
People from Jingzhou
Wuhan University alumni
Members of the Chinese Academy of Engineering
Engineers from Hubei